William Arthur Hill (31 October 1896 – 1958) was a British track and field athlete who competed in the 1920 Summer Olympics. In 1920 he was a member of the British relay team which finish fourth in the 4 × 100 metre relay event. In the 100 metres competition he was eliminated in the semi-finals and in the 200 metres event he was eliminated in the quarter-finals.

He was born in Bromley in Greater London and died in Royal Tunbridge Wells.

References

External links
William Hill. Sports Reference. Retrieved on 2015-01-23.

1896 births
1958 deaths
Olympic athletes of Great Britain
Athletes (track and field) at the 1920 Summer Olympics
British male sprinters
English male sprinters
People from Bromley
Athletes from London
20th-century British people